The Zettenkaiser is a 1,968 m high mountain with a summit cross in the Kaiser Mountains (Kaisergebirge) in the Northern Limestone Alps in Austria. It rises to the west of the almost 150-metre-higher Scheffauer, from which it is separated by a col.  It is one of the more rarely visited summits in the Kaiser. There are great views south to the main chain of the Alps, north to the Zahmer Kaiser and west into the Inn Valley; to the east at the foot of the summit is the rock needle known as the Kaindlnadel and then the mighty Scheffauer.

Routes 
The waymarked normal route starts by the privately run Kaindl Hut (1,293m), runs via the Großer and Kleiner Friedhof (two cirques), up a 3 to 4-metre-high rock step (grade I/II) and gullies in mountain pine terrain in order to reach the western arête at about 1,700 metres. The arête is not particularly difficult (grade I), but is exposed in places however and requires a head for heights and sure-footedness. There is no protection and the waymarks have faded in places (as at 2013); if one leaves the route the ascent becomes markedly more difficult.

Literature and map 
 Horst Höfler, Jan Piepenstock: Kaisergebirge alpin. Alpenvereinsführer alpin für Wanderer und Bergsteiger (= Alpenvereinsführer). 12th edn. Bergverlag Rother, Munich, 2006, .
 Pit Schubert: Kaisergebirge extrem. Alpenvereinsführer für Kletterer (= Alpenvereinsführer). Bergverlag Rother, Munich, 2000, 
 Alpine Club Map 1:25,000, Kaisergebirge, Sheet 8.

One-thousanders of Austria
Mountains of the Alps
Mountains of Tyrol (state)
Kaiser Mountains